The women's 3000 meter at the 2019 KNSB Dutch Single Distance Championships took place in Heerenveen at the Thialf ice skating rink on Saturday 29 December 2018. Although this tournament was held in 2018, it was part of the 2018–2019 speed skating season.

There were 18 participants.

Title holder was Antoinette de Jong.

Overview

Result

  DQ = Disqualified

Draw

Source:

References

Single Distance Championships
2019 Single Distance
World